The Roxy Theatre (often just the Roxy) is a nightclub on the Sunset Strip in West Hollywood, California, owned by Lou Adler and his son, Nic.

History 
The Roxy was opened on September 23, 1973, by Elmer Valentine and Lou Adler, along with original partners David Geffen, Elliot Roberts and Peter Asher. They took over the building previously occupied by a strip club owned by Chuck Landis called the Largo. (Adler was also responsible for bringing the stage play The Rocky Horror Show to the United States, and it opened its first American run at The Roxy Theatre in 1974, before it was made into the movie The Rocky Horror Picture Show the next year.)

Neil Young and the Santa Monica Flyers (billed as Crazy Horse, a related ensemble) played the Roxy for the first three days it was open. Only three months later, the Genesis lineup with Peter Gabriel played several consecutive days at the Roxy, a run that some band members and many fans consider to be amongst their finest performances (due in part, to the intimate atmosphere and good acoustics of the venue).

Paul Reubens, then a struggling comedian, introduced his Pee-wee Herman character in a raunchy revue here in 1981 that included such aspiring comics as Phil Hartman and Elayne Boosler.

Tom Eyen's hit comedy Women Behind Bars enjoyed a long extended run with such stars as Lu Leonard, Adrienne Barbeau, Sally Kellerman, and Linda Blair, and was the site of the very first AIDS benefit ever held in Los Angeles on July 27, 1983.

The small On the Rox bar above the club has hosted a wide variety of debauchery in its history. The bar was a regular hangout for John Lennon, Harry Nilsson, Alice Cooper and Keith Moon during Lennon's "lost weekend" in 1973-74 and hosted parties arranged by Heidi Fleiss in the 1980s.

In January 2014, Goldenvoice became the exclusive promoter for The Roxy & ushered in a new era by bringing in big-name acts such as U2 & Foo Fighters.

On the Rox 

On the Rox is a somewhat hidden bar located above the Roxy Theater (often just the Roxy) on the Sunset Strip in West Hollywood, California. It is owned by Grammy Award-winning American music legend Lou Adler and his sons,  Nicolaj "Nic" Adler and Cisco Adler, who are also in charge of operations.

Today the bar serves as a frequent hotspot for much of the young Hollywood population in Los Angeles. Every evening, the bar is hosted by Medford & Fish who reveal that day on their Instagram page an opening time and sometimes even a theme. The bar's exclusivity works through the frequent attendance of their regular crowd. The majority of the crowd includes band members, singers, songwriters, youtubers, viners, influencers, etc. Many of the nights are also hosted by their regular attendees and "members", as they throw private birthday parties and events. Although the bar is exclusive, there are times when less notable attendees are permitted to attend. This is as long as the bar is not closed for a private party or if not too many high-profile attendees are inside already. It also heavily depends on whether their designated and regular bouncer believes you fit the vibe of the bar.

Owners 

Lou Adler (born December 13, 1933), in addition to being one of three owners of On the Rox and co-owner of the Roxy Theater, is a Grammy Award-winning American record producer, music executive, talent manager, songwriter, film director, and film producer. Some of Adler's most notable works include producing and developing iconic musical artists such as Carole King, The Mamas & the Papas, and The Grass Roots. Additionally, Adler was an executive producer of the longest-running theatrical film in history, The Rocky Horror Picture Show. Born in Chicago, Illinois and raised in the Boyle Heights neighborhood of Los Angeles, Adler began his career in music by co-managing Jan & Dean, alongside Herb Alpert before starting his own record label, Dunhill Records, of which he was president and chief record producer. In 1967, Adler sold Dunhill Records to ABC and founded Ode Records. Adler has six children, including sons Nic Adler and Cisco Adler, from three separate relationships.
Nicolaj "Nic" Adler (born in June 1973) is the first born son of music and film legend Lou Adler and actress Britt Ekland. Together, father and son own On the Rox and the Roxy Theater along with his younger half-brother Cisco Adler. Additionally, Adler is also the culinary director for the Coachella Valley Music and Arts Festival and festival director of the Arroyo Seco Weekend festival. Born and raised in Los Angeles, Adler spent much of his time at the Roxy Theater and at On the Rox as he and his brother threw many parties in the secret upstairs bar.
Cisco Adler (born September 6, 1978) is the second born son of music and film legend Lou Adler and his then-girlfriend, Phyllis Somer. In addition to co-owning On the Rox with his father and half-brother, Nic Adler, Adler is also a musician and Grammy-nominated record producer. His most notable work includes his many collaborations with hip-hop artist, Shwayze, such as the extremely famous hits, "Buzzin'" and "Corona and Lime". Adler has also worked with artists such as Mod Sun, Mike Posner, Cody Simpson, and The Internet, and in 2016, produced the soundtrack for the musical comedy television film remake, The Rocky Horror Picture Show: Let's Do the Time Warp Again. Born and raised in Los Angeles, California, Adler spent much his time at the Roxy Theater and at On the Rox as he and his brother threw many parties in the secret upstairs bar.

Recordings and notable performances 

 the Tragically Hip recorded Live at the Roxy in 1991
Neil Young recorded the live album Roxy: Tonight's The Night Live on September 20–22, 1973. The album was released in April 2018.
Jazz group The Crusaders recorded the live album Scratch at the Roxy in 1974.
Frank Zappa & The Mothers of Invention recorded most of their Roxy and Elsewhere (1974) album during December 1973. Since 1974, various albums have included material from those shows. In 2015, a live concert video was released showing those performances. The entire series of performances (all four public shows from December 9–10, 1973) was released as a 7-CD box set in February 2018. 
Bob Marley & The Wailers recorded Live at the Roxy (released in 2008) on May 26, 1976.
Richard Pryor recorded Bicentennial Nigger in July, 1976.
The Ramones played their first California concert at the Roxy on August 11, 1976. The concert scenes for their 1979 movie Rock 'n' Roll High School were filmed at the Roxy in December 1978.
George Benson's Platinum live album Weekend in L.A. (1978) was culled from a three-night engagement at The Roxy from September 30 – October 2, 1977.
John Mayall's November 24 1976 concert at the Roxy was released in 1977 as "Lots of People".
Nine songs from Bruce Springsteen & the E Street Band's Live/1975-85 album were recorded at the Roxy from shows in 1975 and 1978. The 1978 show was also broadcast on local radio station KMET and released as a live album in July 2018. One of the nights done in 1975 was released in December 2018.
Van Morrison recorded a radio show in November 1978 that was released as a promo LP Live at the Roxy.
The live album Welcome to the Club by the Ian Hunter Band, featuring Mick Ronson, was recorded at the Roxy during seven shows over a week in November 1979 and released the following year.
Bob Marley and The Wailers played here on November 27, 1979, as part of their Survival Tour.
English prog rock band Gentle Giant played their last gig here on June 16, 1980. The soundboard recording was later released as the live album The Last Steps.
English prog rock band Genesis played here on May 25, 1980 as part of their Duke tour
Warren Zevon's live album, Stand in the Fire, was recorded during five shows he played at The Roxy in April 1980. He also recorded another album, Live at The Roxy, in April 1978, and this was released in 2020.
Musician Stevie Wonder played a concert at the Roxy featuring the first ever live performances of his hits Lately and Master Blaster (Jammin'). 
Tom Browne presents his Album "Love Approach" with the hit "Funkin for Jamaica" feat. Tony Smith, in August 1980
Crusaders present their new LP with "Street Life" feat. Randy Crawford, in August 1980
Chaka Khan presents "What cha gonna do for me" with Steve Ferrone and Brecker Bros. on June 7, 1981
Billy & The Beaters' 1981 debut album (including singles "I Can Take Care of Myself" and "At This Moment") was recorded live at the Roxy January 15–17, 1981.
In 1984, Ratt recorded the video for their hit single "Back for More" from the album Out of the Cellar at The Roxy.
Guns N' Roses recorded Live at the Roxy in 1986.
Jane's Addiction recorded the basic tracks for their 1987 self-titled debut album, at The Roxy in January, 1987. While the album was finished in studio, the band hoped tracking the basics live would better help capture the energy and essence of the band.
The Too Hot For Snakes album by Carla Olson and Mick Taylor was recorded on March 4, 1990. 
Agent Orange's live album Real Live Sound was recorded here on July 21, 1990. 
System of a Down made their first performance here on May 28, 1995, due to their manager and bassist Shavo Odadjian persisting.
NOFX's live album I Heard They Suck Live!! was recorded at the Roxy on January 8–9, 1995.
Michel Polnareff's live album Live at the Roxy was recorded in 1995 and released in 1996.
Social Distortion released a live album, entitled Live at the Roxy on June 30, 1998, that was recorded on April 7–9, 1998.
Gustavo Cerati as part of the album presentation tour: Bocanada on December, 2000.
The CD/DVD album Collision Course by Linkin Park and Jay-Z, comes with a DVD that contains behind the scene footage and the second take of all the Collision Course's songs at the Roxy Theatre on July 18, 2004.
Adele performed at the theatre during her debut concert tour called "An Evening with Adele" on 21 May 2008.
Sum 41 shot the video for their song "Screaming Bloody Murder" at the Roxy on April 3, 2011.
Fuse TV taped the live performance of Red Hot Chili Peppers for Fuse Presents: Red Hot Chili Peppers Live from the Roxy on August 22, 2011.
Korn shot the performance part of the video for their song "Narcissistic Cannibal" at the Roxy on September 27, 2011.
Escape the Fate released a DVD, Escape the Fate: Live from the Roxy from their free show there on January 6, 2013. It was included in their Deluxe version of the album Ungrateful.
 7horse held their record release party for their latest album “The Last Resort” on November 4,2022.  Guests included Nick Maybury and Cherie Currie, as well as burlesque dancers, magician and other assorted characters.

See also

Rainbow Bar and Grill
Whisky a Go Go
Sunset Strip
Troubadour
The Viper Room

References

External links
The Roxy official website

Nightclubs in Los Angeles County, California
Buildings and structures in West Hollywood, California
Landmarks in Los Angeles
Music venues in Los Angeles
1973 establishments in California
Art Deco architecture in California